Aubonne may refer to:

 Aubonne (river), a river in the canton of Vaud, Switzerland
 Aubonne, Doubs, a commune in Doubs, France
 Aubonne, Switzerland, a municipality in Switzerland
 Aubonne District, a former district of the canton of Vaud in Switzerland
 Aubonne Castle, a castle in the municipality of Aubonne of the Canton of Vaud in Switzerland

See also